Christmas Queens is a Christmas album featuring classic covers and original songs by several of the contestants and fan favorites from the TV series RuPaul's Drag Race. The album was released on November 13, 2015. 

The sequel album, Christmas Queens 2, was released in 2016, followed by Christmas Queens 3 in 2017 and Christmas Queens 4 in 2018.

Promotion
In support of this release, the artists embarked on The Christmas Queens Tour, which featured them performing tracks from the album.
Also, music videos were released for many of the album tracks, including Alaska Thunderfuck's "Everyday Is Christmas," Detox Icunt's "This Is How We Jew It" and Jiggly Caliente's "Ratchet Christmas."

Tour dates

Chart performance
In the US, the album debuted and peaked at number 2 on the Billboard Comedy Albums chart.

Track listing

Charts

References

External links

2015 Christmas albums
2015 compilation albums
Christmas compilation albums
Pop Christmas albums
RuPaul's Drag Race albums
Producer Entertainment Group albums